"Vegetables" (early versions spelled as "Vega-Tables") is a song by American rock band the Beach Boys from their 1967 album Smiley Smile. Written by Brian Wilson and Van Dyke Parks, it was one of the last tracks recorded for the unfinished album Smile and was briefly projected to be that album's lead single. Like other tracks on Smiley Smile, the finished arrangement was more stripped-down than the version conceived for Smile.

The song was partly inspired by Wilson's obsession with physical fitness in the late 1960s. In a contemporary article, he stated, "I want to turn people on to vegetables, good natural food, organic food. Health is an important element in spiritual enlightenment. But I do not want to be pompous about it, so we will engage in a satirical approach." Another reported inspiration for the song was a humorous comment Wilson heard about the effect of marijuana turning him and his friends into a "vegetative" state.

The Beatles' Paul McCartney is rumored to be a guest contributor on early versions of the track that were released for the compilations Good Vibrations: Thirty Years of the Beach Boys (1993) and The Smile Sessions (2011). While many witnesses support that he contributed chewed celery noises at an early session, held in April 1967, researchers failed to uncover any audio evidence that would confirm his presence on any surviving recording of the song.

Background
The song was composed in 1966 and first attempted during the aborted Smile sessions.  In a contemporary article, Wilson said, "I want to turn people on to vegetables, good natural food, organic food. Health is an important element in spiritual enlightenment. But I do not want to be pompous about it, so we will engage in a satirical approach." Biographer David Leaf wrote that the song was based on Wilson's reported health obsession at the time. The Saturday Evening Post writer Jules Siegel said that while using marijuana with Wilson and the "Beach Boys marijuana-consumption squad" Michael Vosse mused at how violence in their "vegetative" state could not be achieved, provoking laughter and further discussion of being a vegetable. Siegel said that this encounter was what inspired Wilson to write the song.

Although it is not definitely known to be true, "Vega-Tables" is generally believed to fulfill the Earth part of "The Elements" suite that Brian envisioned for Smile. One of the illustrations created for the album included "Vega-Tables" as part of "The Elements", however, a preliminary track list from December 1966 indicated "The Elements" and "Vega-Tables" as separate tracks.

The "Vega-Tables" spelling may have been inspired by the Vejtables, a group who opened for the Beach Boys at a concert on January 1, 1966.

Unused sections
An early recording of the song, referred to as the "cornucopia" version, features discarded lyrics that were likely to be written by Van Dyke Parks: "Tripped on a cornucopia / Stripped the stalk green and I hope ya / Like me the most of all / My favorite vegetable".

Some versions also feature an interpolated section after the verses involving Barbershop-style vocal harmonies sung by the Beach Boys. The lyrics are "mom and dad say / sleep a lot, eat a lot / brush 'em like crazy / run a lot, do a lot / never be lazy". At one point, this section was considered for inclusion on "Heroes and Villains" under the subheaders "Do a Lot" or "Sleep a Lot".

Artwork

Artist Frank Holmes, who designed the Smile cover artwork, created an illustration that was inspired by the song's lyrics, "The Elements" / "My Vega-Tables". Along with several other drawings, they were planned to be included within a booklet packaged with the Smile LP. In 2005, Holmes shared a background summary of his design choices:

Smile sessions

Overview

Recording for "Vega-Tables" or "Vegetables" spanned from  through . On November 4, 1966, Wilson produced a session dedicated to capturing a "humorous" situation featuring himself, Parks, Danny Hutton, Vosse, and a man named Bob. Towards the end of the exercise, the group plays a rhythm on bongos while chanting "Where's my beets and carrots" and "I've got a big bag of vegetables". On November 16, Wilson produced another humor session, this time dedicated to recording mock disagreements between Vosse and session drummer Hal Blaine. The latter play-acts as a man that is irate at Vosse for trespassing into his garden. It later turns into a serious conversation between Blaine, Vosse, and Wilson about the planetary alignments. Wilson completes the session by having his own mock disagreement with Blaine. Badman writes, "At one point, it is believed that these recordings will somehow figure into the 'Vegetables' track itself."

In February 1967, Wilson announced that "Vega-Tables" would be the lead single from Smile, although he had only recorded the "cornucopia" demo of the song at this point. To taunt the record company, Wilson staged a mock promotion of the "Vega-Tables" by holding a photoshoot at the Los Angeles Farmers Market, where he posed in front of a fruit and vegetable stand. Parks was against having the song as the album's single. He later commented, "I am sure I would not have wanted 'Vega-Tables' to be given too much emphasis. For Smile, that celebrated collaboration, to be dependent on a commercial release of 'Vega-Tables' as a single, was to me tremendously ill-advised, wherever it came from." In early April, the band spent at least eight studio dates recording "Vega-Tables" before embarking on a US tour on the 14th of the month.

Parks' last recorded appearance on the album's sessions was for a "Vega-Tables" date on April 14, after which he withdrew from the project. Afterward, Wilson took a four-week break from the studio.  On April 29, publicist Derek Taylor reported that a single, "Vegetables" backed with "Wonderful", would soon be released. He described it as "a light and lyrical, day to day, green grocery song on which Al Jardine sings a most vigorous lead."

McCartney visit

During the April 10 vocal session at Sound Recorders, which also saw work on "Wonderful" and "Child Is Father of the Man", Paul McCartney of the Beatles joined the Beach Boys in the studio for several hours. Al Jardine remembered that:

KROQ DJ Rodney Bingenheimer said he was present at this session with McCartney: "We were in a booth, and we were supposed to shout out the names of vegetables. I was a young, punk kid at the time, and I shouted out 'TV dinners!' I didn't know ..." Wilson's first wife Marilyn said, "Paul came to the Vega-Tables session. Brian had some fresh vegetables out, for the mood. He sprinkled salt all over the console table near the mixing board and started dipping celery into the salt and chomping on it. Paul followed his lead and picked up the celery and did the same thing. It was priceless to see this."

Asked about his involvement in a 2001 interview, McCartney said he had no memory of chomping vegetables at the session. In 2016, he offered a specific recollection:

On the existing tapes for these sessions, McCartney's presence cannot be verified, and it is unclear if any record of his performance has survived. Archivist Craig Slowinski, who assembled the sessionography included with The Smile Sessions box set, stated: "I was ready to credit Sir Paul with 'veggie munching' ... but since no tapes were found with his voice or reference to him, we figured I'd better not. Too hard to say that any veggie munching on his part remained on tape through the final stages of production." Sessions co-producer Mark Linett explained: "Unless Paul is being very quiet, there’s no evidence that he’s a part of the chomping.  And there’s quite a lot of discussion going on while that particular track is being recorded."

After the "Vega-Tables" session, McCartney performed his song "She's Leaving Home" on piano for Wilson and his wife. Wilson said: "We both just cried. It was beautiful." He performed "Wonderful" on piano for McCartney.  Beatles roadie Mal Evans wrote about singing the traditional "On Top of Old Smokey" with McCartney and Wilson, but was not impressed by Wilson's avant-garde attitude to music: "Brian then put a damper on the spontaneity of the whole affair by walking in with a tray of water-filled glasses, trying to arrange it into some sort of session." In a January 1968 interview, Wilson stated of the McCartney episode that "it was a little uptight and we really didn't seem to hit it off. It didn't really flow. ... It didn't really go too good."

Smiley Smile sessions
The Smile album was reported scrapped on May 5, 1967. Starting on June 3, "Vega-Tables" was rerecorded for the new album Smiley Smile, where it was respelled "Vegetables" and reworked as a kind of campfire song. Apart from its coda (recorded April 1967), the track was remade entirely from scratch.  Wilson played the electric bass on this version and added organ overdubs to the final section of the song.

According to Al Jardine, "I remember telling Brian, 'We’ve got to do something different on this thing.'  What the hell, it was four in the morning.  I filled some water bottles, tuned it to the key of the song and blew air into the bottles.  What you hear sounds like an old organ."

"Vegetables" was mixed to mono on June 3, 1967. A recording for "You're with Me Tonight", held on June 6, was logged as a "Vega-Tables" session.

"Mama Says"

In 1967, the song was revisited for the last time as the closing track "Mama Says" on Wild Honey (1967). This version consisted of an extended re-recording of the unused "Do or Lot" or "Sleep a Lot" module. It was the first time a track with thematic links to Smile was used to close a later Beach Boys album, the others being 20/20 (1969) and Surf's Up (1971). Inexplicably, Parks' songwriting credit was not honored, and instead Mike Love was listed as the song's only co-writer.

Other versions

Alternate releases
 In 1993, a composite version from the Smile sessions was given its first official release, under its original title "Vega-Tables", along with a slew of other Smile material, on the Good Vibrations boxset.
 In 2001, some recordings related to the song were released on the rarities compilation Hawthorne, CA.
 In 2011, many more composite versions were made available on The Smile Sessions.
 In 2013, a 1993 live performance of the song was released on the compilation Made in California with Carl Wilson and Al Jardine on lead vocals.

Cover versions

1968 – Jan and Dean (under the name Laughing Gravy) on a single released in 1968 and later under Jan and Dean on their 1971 Jan & Dean Anthology Album and in 1974 on their Gotta Take That One Last Ride album. The version on Gotta Take That One Last Ride contains additional instrumental and vocal overdubs by Brian Wilson and American Spring in 1973.
1991 – Sink, Vega-Tables
 2001 – "Receptacle for the Respectable" from the album Rings Around the World by Super Furry Animals also features Paul McCartney chewing celery and carrots.

Personnel
These credits pertain to The Smile Sessions version.

The Beach Boys
 Al Jardine – lead, backing and harmony vocals, miscellaneous percussion and sound effects, vegetable chomping, whistling (uncertain credit)
 Mike Love – backing and harmony vocals, laughter, vegetable chomping
 Brian Wilson – backing and harmony vocals, laughter, grand piano, miscellaneous percussion and sound effects, vegetable chomping, detuned grand piano, electric harpsichord, whistling (uncertain credit)
 Carl Wilson – backing and harmony vocals, laughter, miscellaneous percussion and sound effects, vegetable chomping, Fender bass, overdubbed ukulele
 Dennis Wilson – backing and harmony vocals, laughter, miscellaneous percussion and sound effects, vegetable chomping, thump percussion, overdubbed drum, xylophone, rattling percussion

Session musicians

 Arnold Belnick – violin
 Samuel Boghossian – viola
 Chuck Berghofer – overdubbed upright bass (verses)
 Joseph DiFiore – viola
 Joseph DiTullio – cello
 Jim Gordon – hi-hat, castanet, cups
 Raymond Kelley – cello
 William Kurasch – violin

 Nick Pellico – vibraphone
 Bill Pitman – tenor ukulele (Danelectro bass on early takes)
 Ray Pohlman – Fender bass (fade)
 Lyle Ritz – upright bass (fade)

See also
 Radiant Radish – a health food store co-owned by Brian Wilson from 1969 to 1970

Notes

References

Bibliography

External links

1967 songs
The Beach Boys songs
Brian Wilson songs
Songs written by Brian Wilson
Songs written by Van Dyke Parks
Song recordings produced by Brian Wilson
Song recordings produced by the Beach Boys
Jan and Dean songs
Songs about plants
Satirical songs
Paul McCartney